Schefflera multinervia is a species of plant in the family Araliaceae. It is endemic to China.

References

multinervia
Endemic flora of China
Vulnerable plants
Taxonomy articles created by Polbot